Deh Cho is a territorial electoral district for the Legislative Assembly of the Northwest Territories, Canada. The district consists of Enterprise, Fort Providence, Hay River Reserve and Kakisa.

Members of the Legislative Assembly (MLAs)

Election results

2019 election

2015 election

2011 election

2007 election

2003 election

1999 election

1995 election

1991 election

1987 election

1983 election

References

External links 
Website of the Legislative Assembly of Northwest Territories

Northwest Territories territorial electoral districts